The Woman in the Cupboard is a 1927 German silent comedy film directed by Rudolf Biebrach and starring Kaethe Consee and Willy Fritsch. It was adapted by Bobby E. Lüthge from the play by Octave Mirbeau and Soulié Dussieux de Chennevières. The film's art direction was by Erich Czerwonski.

Cast
In alphabetical order
 Rudolf Biebrach
 Kaethe Consee
 Willy Fritsch as Dr. Richard Marchal
 Harry Hardt as Solicitor Thibault
 Arnold Korff as Col. Gaston Belfort
 Olga Limburg
 Fee Malten as Claire Labori
 Imre Ráday
 Gyula Szőreghy
 Ruth Weyher as Lucie

References

Bibliography
 Grange, William. Cultural Chronicle of the Weimar Republic. Scarecrow Press, 2008.

External links 
 

1927 films
1927 comedy films
German comedy films
Films of the Weimar Republic
German silent feature films
Films directed by Rudolf Biebrach
UFA GmbH films
German black-and-white films
Silent comedy films
1920s German films
Films based on works by Octave Mirbeau